Benjanun Sriduangkaew is a Thai writer of science fiction and fantasy who is also known for controversial online criticism. She was a finalist for the 2014 John W. Campbell Award for Best New Writer and the 2014 BSFA Award for Best Short Fiction, for Scale-Bright.

Life
Sriduangkaew was born in Pattani Province in southern Thailand. After attending university in Bangkok, she worked in Manila, Jakarta, and Hong Kong. In 2013, Sriduangkaew said that she had earned her bachelor's degree "some twelve years ago" and that she had not been fluent in English at the time.

Work
Sriduangkaew began publishing short fiction in 2012, with "Courtship in the Country of the Machine Gods", and established a name for herself with a string of high-profile short stories in Clarkesworld Magazine and elsewhere, which led to her nomination for the John W. Campbell Award.

Her first long-form publication was the urban fantasy novella Scale-Bright, published in 2014. A follow-up to her three Sun-Moon Cycle stories, it is a love story about a young woman from Hong Kong who has to rescue her sister from Heaven. Reviewing the novella for Tor.com, Niall Alexander described it as "an achievement without equal", appreciating its "delicately drawn characters", "affecting narrative", and the author's prose skills.

Her second novella, Winterglass, was published in 2017. It is a science-fantasy retelling of the story of the Snow Queen. A Publishers Weeklys reviewer considered that the "promising novella" provided "variations on the theme of strong female characters" but was marred by an "uneven plot and some missed opportunities for complex worldbuilding".

Her third novella, And Shall Machines Surrender, was published in 2019. It is a science fiction story focusing on artificial intelligences and their relationships to humanity. Reviewing the novella in The Future Fire, J. Moufawad-Paul wrote: “And Shall Machines Surrender is the perfect example of how much can possibly be packed into a novella. The equal depth of style, story, characterization, and world-building is quite striking”; and, “Due to the strength of And Shall Machines Surrender — its clarity and intricacy, its ability to compress complexity into a minimalist structure — it is almost criminal that Sriduangkaew is not a household name”.

Most of Sriduangkaew's work is queer-normative and trans-inclusive, and foregrounds lesbian relationships and South-East-Asian themes or influences.

Online activity
In 2014, Sriduangkaew was revealed to have been the controversial blogger and book reviewer "Requires Hate" (also known as "Requires Only That You Hate", as well as "Winterfox"). Using these internet identities, she published critiques of what she considered to be racist, sexist, heteronormative, or colonial themes in works of science fiction and fantasy; these critiques were often expressed in personal language deemed insulting or threatening by readers. Media outlets and social media users referred to Sriduangkaew as a "notorious troll". Some outlets speculated that Sriduangkaew could be fabricating her Chinese-Thai identity, though no substantial evidence for those claims has been provided.

In October 2014, Sriduangkaew posted an apology on her blog, admitting to being "a horrendous asshole" and causing pain to others, while also denying certain allegations that she had made rape threats, stating that other accounts had impersonated her. The blog remains inactive.

A blog post by fellow writer Laura J. Mixon critiquing Sriduangkaew's behavior won Mixon the 2015 Hugo Award for Best Fan Writer.

Views on Sriduangkaew's behaviour and Mixon's article remain split. Detractors claimed that the Mixon article was a "hit piece" aimed at an up-and-coming woman of colour, conflating Sribuangkaew's insulting language with abuse, while ignoring the content of her criticisms against the status quo in science fiction and fantasy writing.

In a blog post in 2015, Sriduangkaew wrote that she had become the target of harassment and cyberstalking campaigns after her internet identities were revealed, while conceding that "I've been shitty in the past".

Bibliography
Novels
 Machine’s Last Testament, Prime Books (2020), 

Novellas
 Scale-Bright, Immersion Press (2014), 
 Winterglass, Apex Publications (2017), 
 And Shall Machines Surrender, Prime Books (2019), 
 Mirrorstrike, Apex Publications (2019), 
 Now Will Machines Hollow the Beast, Prime Books (2020), 
 Shall Machines Divide the Earth, Prime Books (2021), 
 Where Machines Redeem the Lost, Prime Books (2021), 
 Now Will Machines Devour the Stars, Prime Books (2022)
 Shall Machines Bite the Sun, Prime Books (2023)

Novelettes
 Then Will the Sun Rise Alabaster, Prime Books (2019), 

Collaborations
 Methods Devour Themselves (with J. Moufawad-Paul), Zero Books (2018), 

Short fiction
 "Chang’e Dashes from the Moon" (2012)
 "Courtship in the Country of Machine-Gods" (2012)
 "Woman of the Sun, Woman of the Moon" (2012)
 "Fade to Gold" (2013)
 "Annex" (2013)
 "The Crows Her Dragon's Gate" (2013)
 "Vector" (2013)
 "The Bees Her Heart, the Hive Her Belly" (2013)
 "Silent Bridge, Pale Cascade" (2013)
 "Autodidact" (2014)
 "Golden Daughter, Stone Wife" (2014)
 "When We Harvested the Nacre-Rice" (2014)
 "Synecdoche Oracles" (2014)
 "And the Burned Moths Remain" (2015)
 "The Petals Abide" (2015), Clarkesworld
 "The Insurrectionist and the Empress Who Reigns Over Time" (2015)
 "The Occidental Bride" (2015)
 "The Beast at the End of Time" (2016)
 "Dream Command" (2016)
 "The Finch’s Wedding and the Hive That Sings" (2016)
 "That Which Stands Tends Toward Free Fall" (2016)
 "Comet’s Call" (2016)
 "Under She Who Devours Suns" (2016)
 "The Prince Who Gave Up Her Empire" (2016)
 "We Are All Wasteland On The Inside" (2016)
 "Parable of the Cocoon" (2017)
 "The Sun Shall Lie Across Us Like Gold" (2017)
 "The Universe as Vast as Our Longings" (2017)
 "No Pearls as Blue as These" (2017)
 "After-Swarm" (2017)
 "You and I Shall be as Radiant" (2017)
 "The Owls of Juttshatan" (2018)
 "Red as Water, White as Ruin" (2018)
 "The Five Secret Truths of Demonkind" (2018)
 "Tiger, Tiger Bright" (2019)
 "Where Machines Run with Gold" (2019)
 "That August Song" (2019)
 "We Will Become as Monsters" (2020)
 "The City Still Dreams of Her Name" (2020)

Collections
 The Archer Who Shot Down Suns: Scale-Bright Stories (2014), collecting the stories "The Crows Her Dragon's Gate", "Woman of the Sun, Woman of the Moon" and "Chang'e Dashes from the Moon",

References

External links
 
 Sriduangkaew's blog

Benjanun Sriduangkaew
Living people
Internet trolls
Benjanun Sriduangkaew
Year of birth missing (living people)
Women science fiction and fantasy writers
Benjanun Sriduangkaew
21st-century novelists
Benjanun Sriduangkaew
Benjanun Sriduangkaew
Benjanun Sriduangkaew
21st-century short story writers
Benjanun Sriduangkaew